Anna Mozhar (born 3 March 1974) is a Kazakhstani archer. She competed in the women's individual and team events at the 1996 Summer Olympics.

References

External links
 

1974 births
Living people
Kazakhstani female archers
Olympic archers of Kazakhstan
Archers at the 1996 Summer Olympics
Place of birth missing (living people)
20th-century Kazakhstani women